Amira Kandil (born 21 February 2003) is an Egyptian modern pentathlete. She competed in the women's event at the 2020 Summer Olympics.

References

External links
 

2003 births
Living people
Egyptian female modern pentathletes
Modern pentathletes at the 2020 Summer Olympics
Olympic modern pentathletes of Egypt
Place of birth missing (living people)
21st-century Egyptian women
World Modern Pentathlon Championships medalists